Eileen Clarke may refer to:

 Eileen Clarke (Neighbours), a character on the soap opera Neighbours
 Eileen Clarke (politician), Canadian politician in Manitoba